Gerald Michael Charlebois (born April 17, 1929), better known as Michael Forest, is an American actor who provides the voices for many animated titles.

Early life
Born in Harvey, North Dakota, he moved with his family at a very early age to Seattle, Washington. He graduated with a B.A. in English and drama from San Jose State University.

Career

At age 71, Forest voiced Prince Olympius in Power Rangers Lightspeed Rescue. In his earlier years, he was a film and television actor, notably playing Apollo in the 1967 Star Trek episode "Who Mourns for Adonais?" He again played that role in the Star Trek Continues episode "Pilgrim of Eternity", 47 years later, with his wife, actress Diana Hale. He also appeared as a priest in a case of mistaken identity on a 1964 episode of The Dick Van Dyke Show.

Filmography

Anime

 Aika R-16: Virgin Mission - Gozo Aida, Tsukino (Ep. 2)
 Armitage III - Vice-Minister Jessup
 The Big O - Alex Rosewater
 Black Jack - Dr. Stanfield, Ernesto
 Blade of the Immortal - Asana, Takayuki Asano
 Carried by the Wind: Tsukikage Ran - Sneaky Spider Saizo
 Casshan: Robot Hunter - Adm. Rudolph
 Crying Freeman - Don Carleone, Shudo Shimazaki
 Cybuster - Ryuzo
 Daphne in the Brilliant Blue - Ishiyama (Ep. 1), Martin, Sho Mizuki
 Dirty Pair Flight 005 Conspiracy - Dietrch (Streamline Dub)
 Doomed Megalopolis - Eiichi Subasawa
 El-Hazard - Yuba Yarius
 Eureka Seven - Braya
 Gad Guard - Dorgel, Dove, Editor
 Gatchaman - Chief
 Ghost in the Shell: Stand Alone Complex - Kubota
 Ghost Slayers Ayashi - Doi-Oiokami-Toshitsura, Master (Ep. 21)
 Giant Robo - Narrator (Animaze Dub)
 Gungrave - Sid Galarde
 Gun x Sword - Jose
 Heat Guy J - Valter Yulgence
 IGPX - Hans
 I'll CKBC - Mr. Hiiragi
 Kamichu! - Mr. Gen (Ep. 9)
 Last Exile - Emperor of Anatoray
 Mars Daybreak - EF Commander
 Megazone 23 - Eigen Yumekanou (Part 1, Streamline Dub)
 The Melancholy of Haruhi Suzumiya - Arakawa
 Mermaid Forest - Dr. Shiina (Ep. 4–5), Kohakura
 Mirage of Blaze - Kojyuro Katakura
 Mobile Suit Gundam - The Movie Trilogy - Captain Paolo
 Mobile Suit Gundam 0080: War in the Pocket - Charlie
 Mobile Suit Gundam 0083: Stardust Memory - Captain Dry
 Mobile Suit Gundam: The 08th MS Team - Lt. Col. Kojima
 Moribito: Guardian of the Spirit - Blacksmith
 Nadia: The Secret of Blue Water - Cpt. Mayville
 Orguss 02 - Zante
 Planetes - Clifford, Harry Roland, Norman
 R.O.D the TV - Bookstore Owner B
 Samurai Champloo - Inuyama
 Scrapped Princess - King Balteric
 Serial Experiments Lain - Dr. Hodgeson
 Someday's Dreamers - Councilor Rikiya Furusaki, Kazuki
 Street Fighter II V - Captain Dorai (Animaze Dub)
 Teknoman - Commander Jamison
 Trigun - Lurald
 The Twelve Kingdoms - King Hou Chuutatsu
 Witch Hunter Robin - Inquisitor Cortion
 Zillion - Gord

Films

 100 Rifles - Humara
 A House is Not a Home - Bernie
 Appleseed - Elder (Animaze Dub)
 Armitage III - Dual Matrix - Ohara
 Atlas - Atlas
 Beast from Haunted Cave - Gil Jackson
 Black Jack the Movie - Roger Siegel
 Cast Away - Pilot Jack
 Catnapped! - Suttoboke
 The Castle of Cagliostro - Additional Voices
 Cowboy Bebop: The Movie - Ticket
 The Glory Guys - Fred Cushman
 Deathwatch - Greeneyes
 Golgo 13: The Professional - E. Young
 King Kong Lives - Vance
 Lensman - Adm. Haines
 Lupin III: The Mystery of Mamo - Agent Gordon (Streamline dub)
 Mobile Suit Gundam F91 - Theo Fairchild
 The Message - Khalid bin Walid
 Naruto the Movie: Guardians of the Crescent Moon Kingdom - Kakeru Tsuki
 Paprika - Doctor Seijiro Inui
 Redline - Inuki
 Royal Space Force: The Wings of Honneamise - Dr. Gnomm
 Saga of the Viking Women
 Unbelievable!!!!! - Himself
 The Shark - Don
 The Shark Hunter - Donavan 
 Ski Troop Attack - Lt. Factor
 The Scarlet Worm  - Judge Hanchett
 WXIII: Patlabor the Movie 3 - Detective Takeshi Kusumi (as Alfred Thor)

Video games

 Dynasty Warriors 4 - Huang Gai
 Jade Cocoon: Story of the Tamamayu - Gi
 Seven Samurai 20XX - Yagyu

Live-action
 Adventures in Voice Acting - Himself
 Masked Rider - Lavasect (voice; credited as Alfred Thor)
 Power Rangers Lightspeed Rescue - Olympius (voice)

Television

 Laramie - Cobey
 Death Valley Days - Larry Brooks
 Tombstone Territory - Floyd Rank
 The Adventures of Rin Tin Tin - A Brave
 The Adventures of Wild Bill Hickok - Strong Eagle
 Zorro - Anastacio
 Bat Masterson - "The Desert Ship" as Les Wilkins
 Have Gun – Will Travel - Peter Keystone
 Yancy Derringer - Pierre ("The Fair Freebooter", E15)
 The Rifleman - Chaqua
 Wagon Train - Dallas
 Dick Van Dyke Show - Father Joe Coogan
 The Outer Limits - "It Crawled Out of the Woodwork" - Stuart Peters
 The Man from U.N.C.L.E. - Lt. Fest ("The Terbuf Affair," S1 E14)
 Gilligan's Island - Ugundi
 Perry Mason - Pierre Dubois
 Star Trek - Apollo (E33 - "Who Mourns for Adonais?")
 Get Smart - Basil
 One Step Beyond - "Encounter" - Jacques Boutier
 The Twilight Zone - "Black Leather Jackets" - Steve
 Gunsmoke "The Cousin" - Chance; "Innocence" - Bob Sullins; "The Lady" - Ray Pate
 Combat! "Hills are For Heroes" - Captain, Company Commander
 As the World Turns - Nick Andropoulos
 Cheyenne "Renegades" - Yellow Lance & "Wagon-Tongue North" - Lariat Sanga
 Cross Purpose - Spotted Bull
 The Virginian "S04EP10 airdate 1965 11 24 title  Beyond the Border"
 Rawhide - Yuma
 Bonanza - Young Wolf / Frank Shirmer / Wabuska (3 episodes, 1959-1967)Gomer Pyle USMC "The Star Witness" - Fred Cummins

Web series
 Star Trek Continues'' - Apollo ("Pilgrim of Eternity")

References

External links
 
 
 
 Michael Forest at the English Voice Actor & Production Staff Database

1929 births
Living people
American aviators
American male film actors
American male soap opera actors
American male stage actors
American male television actors
American male voice actors
Male actors from Seattle
People from Wells County, North Dakota
San Jose State University alumni
University of Washington alumni
Western (genre) television actors